Bhogireddipalle or Bhogireddypalli is a village in Krishna district of India in the state of Andhra Pradesh. It is located in Machilipatnam Mandal of Machilipatnam Revenue Division.

References

Villages in Krishna district